Sherali Dostiev (Шерали Достиев; born January 12, 1985, in Dushanbe, Region of Republican Subordination) is a male boxer from Tajikistan. He is competing in the Light Flyweight (– 48 kg) division, and won a bronze medal at the 2005 World Amateur Boxing Championships.

He competed at the 2004 Summer Olympics, but was knocked out in the round of 32 by Harry Tanamor of the Philippines. Dostiev qualified for the Athens Games by ending up in first place at the 1st AIBA Asian 2004 Olympic Qualifying Tournament in Guangzhou, PR China. In the final he defeated Thailand's Suban Pannon.

In 2008 he lost 1:12 to Cuban Yampier Hernández.

References
 Profile on CBS
 sports-reference

External links

1985 births
Living people
Sportspeople from Dushanbe
Boxers at the 2004 Summer Olympics
Boxers at the 2008 Summer Olympics
Olympic boxers of Tajikistan
Boxers at the 2006 Asian Games
Tajikistani male boxers
AIBA World Boxing Championships medalists
Asian Games competitors for Tajikistan
Light-flyweight boxers